The following is a list of coaches who have coached the St Kilda Football Club at a game of Australian rules football in the Australian Football League (AFL), formerly the VFL.

Key: 
 P = Played
 W = Won
 L = Lost
 D = Drew
 W% = Win percentage

References
St Kilda Coaches Win–Loss Records at AFL Tables

St Kilda Football Club coaches
 
St Kilda Football Club coaches